All God's Children is a 1996 documentary film directed by Sylvia Rhue, Frances Reid  and Dee Mosbacher. It analyses the relation between Christianity and sexual orientation in the context of the African-American community, and attempts to alleviate stigmatization of lesbians and gay men. Mixed with spiritual music, it tells stories of gays and lesbians in the church and includes testimonies from influential political and religious leaders.

Awards
Best Documentary during the National Black Arts Film Festival (1996)
Best Film on Matters Relating to the "Black Experience" (a Black International Cinema Competition in 1996)
Lambda Liberty Award, Lambda Legal Defense and Education Fund (1997)
Jury's Choice Award at the University of Oregon Queer Film Festival
Apple Award, by National Educational Media Network (1997)
Screening Honoree at the Council on Foundations Film Festival Series (1997–98)

Critical reception
L.A. Times author Linell George states in his article "Breaking the Barriers That Keep Them From Church" that the goal of this film is to educate people about the troubles which gay and lesbian believers face when trying to find and be accepted into a Church. The gay/lesbian community is afraid to leave the security of the familiar. "What feeds this silence is the fear of losing one's safety net, one's spiritual comfort zone." He summarizes the biggest obstacle to overcome is other peoples willingness to support the gay/lesbian community. He says, "This is why the support of family, clergy and policymakers is the linchpin." With the support of these people, all people regardless of sexual preference or gender identity would feel safe within a church home. He says the fear of not having this support keeps the gay/lesbian community away from the church and silent, not allowing a safe place for spiritual growth. He states if we truly know who we are as people we should allow others to be who they are without judgement. He feels this is the best solution to the barriers keeping gays and lesbians from the Church.

See also
 African-American culture and sexual orientation

References

External links
 
 All God's Children page on Woman Vision official website

1996 films
American short documentary films
American independent films
Documentary films about African Americans
1990s English-language films
African-American LGBT-related films
1996 LGBT-related films
Documentary films about LGBT and Christianity
1990s short documentary films
1996 independent films
1990s American films
American LGBT-related short films